The Garden of the Missing in Action is a commemorative garden on Mount Herzl in Jerusalem dedicated to Israeli MIAs.

History
The garden memorializes fighters and officers of the Israel Defense Forces and Land of Israel MIAs starting from 1914, whose resting place is unknown. The garden also contains memorials to those lost aboard the submarine  and the 23 Palmach commandoes lost in Operation Boatswain. 
Since the establishment of the State of Israel in 1948, 179 Israeli soldiers have been declared missing in action, mainly from the 1948 Arab–Israeli War.

The establishment of the Garden of the Missing  was initiated by Moshe Oren, head of the Ministry of Defense Commemoration Division in 2003. It was dedicated in February 2004 in a ceremony attended by army chiefs, Israeli Defense Minister Shaul Mofaz, and members of the Jerusalem Municipality.

Traditions
An annual memorial service for the missing soldiers of Israel takes place in the garden's main plaza on the Seventh of Adar, the day in the Hebrew calendar which marks the traditional date of the death of Moses, whose grave, according to the Bible, is known only to God.

According to the rabbis, ransoming of captives is closely tied to the commandment of saving a life, and is thereby supremely important in Jewish law. Jewish law obligates searching for those who are missing in action even if there is only a remote chance of finding the person. The policy of the Israel Defense Forces is never to leave a soldier behind.

See also
Tomb of the Unknown Soldier

References

External links

 Official web site (in Hebrew)
 Stamp commemorating the opening of the Garden of the Missing Soldiers  by the Israel Postal Company
 Israeli Soldiers "Missing in Action" 

Military monuments and memorials in Israel
Tombs of Unknown Soldiers
Monuments and memorials in Mount Herzl
Jewish cemeteries in Jerusalem
2004 establishments in Israel
Cemeteries established in the 2000s